Allen Ray Brenner (November 13, 1947 – February 13, 2012) was an American gridiron football player.  He played in the Canadian Football League (CFL) for seven years.

Football career
Brenner played defensive back for the Hamilton Tiger-Cats, Winnipeg Blue Bombers and Ottawa Rough Riders from 1971 to 1977. He was a CFL All-Star in 1972, the same year he set a record of most interceptions in a season at 15, and also won the Grey Cup with the Tiger-Cats. He was also part of the Ottawa Rough Riders when they won the Grey Cup in 1976. Brenner started his career with the New York Giants of the NFL, for whom he played two seasons. He played college football at Michigan State University where he was an All-American in 1968. was also the head coach of the Burlington Braves of the Canadian Junior Football League in 1981.

While playing in the CFL for the Hamilton Tiger-Cats he intercepted Joe Theismann four times in one game. Brenner also was part of "The Game of the Century", where both Michigan State and Notre Dame were ranked number one in the country and went to a 10–10 tie in 1966.

Disappearance
Brenner was reported missing in April 1983. He, his wife, and four children were residents of Burlington, Ontario. Brenner is featured in a Fifth Estate program on December 3, 2010 which discusses his disappearance and subsequent resurfacing eight years after abandoning his family. He is interviewed living in an unnamed small town in North Carolina and says he cannot explain why he left.

Death
Brenner died on February 13, 2012, at age 64, in Clinton, North Carolina, after a long illness.

See also
List of solved missing person cases

References

1947 births
1980s missing person cases
2012 deaths
American emigrants to Canada
American football defensive backs
American players of Canadian football
Canadian football defensive backs
Formerly missing people
Hamilton Tiger-Cats players
Michigan State Spartans football players
Missing person cases in Canada
New York Giants players
Ottawa Rough Riders players
People from Benton Harbor, Michigan
Players of American football from Michigan
Winnipeg Blue Bombers players